New Albany Downtown Historic District may refer to:

 New Albany Downtown Historic District (Indiana), listed on the NRHP in Indiana
 New Albany Downtown Historic District (Mississippi), listed on the NRHP in Mississippi